Janak Singh is an Indian politician, currently a member of Bhartiya Janata Party and Member Of Legislative Assembly from Taraiya (Vidhan Sabha constituency).

He was made the deputy Chief Secretary of BJP in Bihar. He has been involved with RSS and  ABVP from early age.

He inaugurated the health fair at Taraiya referral hospital. Recently he was also involved in a minor controversy.

References 

Living people
1960 births
Bihar MLAs 2020–2025
Bharatiya Janata Party politicians from Bihar